Lisa Omorodio   professionally credited as Lisa Omorodion is a Nigerian actress, film producer, and entrepreneur. She is best known for her lead role in the 2013 movie, First Cut, alongside Joseph Benjamin and Monalisa Chinda. She is also known for her plus-sized figure.

Early life
Omorodion was born in London.  Her father, who is of Edo descent is an Engineer and the founder of Hensmor Oil and Gas and her mother is a lawyer. She is the fifth of six children.

Omorodion attended Corona Primary School in Lagos, Nigeria. While in Primary school, she joined the school's drama club, where her passion for the arts was ignited. Thereafter, she attended Command Secondary School for three years and then Atlantic hall, Poka Epe Secondary School for her senior secondary school years where she was also a part of the drama club; she then attended the University of Lagos, where she obtained a Bachelor's degree in Economics.

Career
Omorodion produced and starred in her debut feature film First Cut in 2013. The film was noted for creating social awareness on sensitive issues such as rape and domestic violence. In the same year, she founded Platinum Studios, a Nigerian Film Production company. Since then, she has produced and starred in other movies such as Schemers (2015), The Inn (2016) Karma is Bae (2017). She made her small screen acting debut in the Obi Emelonye directed series The Calabash in 2014, in 2015, she began starring as Folakemi in the critically acclaimed television series Skinny Girl in Transit produced by Ndani TV.

Personal life
Asides from film-making and acting, Omorodion serves as a director on the board of Hensmor Oil, an Oil and Gas firm founded by her father.

Awards and recognition
In 2016, Omorodion received the award for Most Promising Actress of the Year by Nigeria Meritorious Award. She also received the recognized as one of Nigeria's 25 under 25 Enterprising females by SME100 Africa in 2016. In the same year, she was nominated for the Most Promising Actress of the Year by City People Awards.

Filmography

Feature films

Television series

References 

Living people
Nigerian film actresses
21st-century Nigerian actresses
Year of birth missing (living people)
Nigerian film producers
Nigerian businesspeople
Nigerian women in business
Nigerian women film producers
Actresses from Edo State
University of Lagos alumni
Nigerian television actresses